Teresa Berenice Vitelli, also known as Suor Veronica, (active 1706 – 1729) was an 18th-century Italian painter.

Biography
Vitelli was born in Florence and became a Roman Catholic nun there. She is known for drawings, watercolours, and gouaches of still-life subjects, as well as copies of other masters.

Vitelli died in Florence.

References

External links

 Teresa Berenice Vitelli on Artnet

1706 births
1729 deaths
18th-century Italian painters
Italian women painters
Painters from Florence
Italian painters of animals
18th-century Italian women artists
Nuns and art